Henry Sanborn Noyes (December 24, 1822 – May 24, 1872) was a president of Northwestern University.

Biography
Noyes was born in Landaff, New Hampshire, on December 24, 1822, to devout Methodist parents. He was graduated from Wesleyan University like many of Northwestern's presidents and early professors. Noyes graduated (in 1848) from the university just 9 years after Clark T. Hinman, the first president of Northwestern, graduated from the institution. Noyes actually studied under Hinman at Newbury Seminary in Montpelier, Vermont (where Hinman was president at the time) shortly thereafter. After Hinman's departure from Newbury Seminary in 1853, Noyes himself became its president.

When Clark Hinman and a group of other Chicago-area Methodists decided to establish a new university near Chicago, Illinois, to serve the old Northwest Territory, Hinman remembered working with Noyes and asked Noyes to join the new faculty. 
Noyes was one of the two original faculty members of the university when it opened in 1855 and served (primarily) as professor of mathematics. When Clark Hinman, the first president of the university, died in 1854, Noyes served as interim president until the election of Randolph S. Foster in 1856. Then, when Foster abdicated his position as president in 1860, Noyes once again served as interim president (1860 to 1867). During his time at Northwestern, Noyes intermittently served a variety of positions alongside his teaching duties (e.g. serving as Secretary of the Board of Trustees and as the university's financial agent).

References

 Arthur Herbert Wilde: Northwestern University: A History, 1855–1905, pp. 219–237 (available in full text at Google Book Search)

1822 births
1870 deaths
Wesleyan University alumni
Presidents of Northwestern University
Methodist ministers
Methodist writers
People from Evanston, Illinois
Mathematicians from New Hampshire
Mathematicians from Illinois
People from Landaff, New Hampshire